Cicely Tyson was the recipient of numerous accolades, including an honorary Academy Award, three Emmy Awards, and a Tony Award. One of the most acclaimed and groundbreaking actresses of her generation, she is known for her portrayals of determined, elegant and dignified female characters in film, on television and in the theatre.

Tyson won three Primetime Emmy Awards for her work in television, winning for The Autobiography of Miss Jane Pittman (1974) and Oldest Living Confederate Widow Tells All (1994). She won the Tony Award for Best Actress in a Play for her performance in The Trip to Bountiful in 2014. Tyson won her Honorary Academy Award in 2018 with the inscription reading, ""Whose unforgettable performances and personal integrity have inspired generations of filmmakers, actors and audiences."

Major associations

Academy Awards
Note: The year given is the year of the ceremony

British Academy Film Awards

Emmy Award

Golden Globe Awards
Note: The year given is the year of the ceremony

Screen Actors Guild Awards

Tony Awards
Note: The year given is the year of the ceremony

Honours 
Note: The year given is the year of the ceremony

Critics awards

References

External links

 

Tyson, Cecily